Marie Atkins was mayor of the Kingston and Saint Andrew Corporation (KSAC) from 1989 to 2003. Atkins was the third female mayor for Kingston & St. Andrew, Jamaica, and is the longest-serving mayor to date for Kingston & St. Andrew. She is the first Jamaican to become the president of the World Conference of Mayors. 
Atkins died at the age of 88 on 28 December 2008.

References

Mayors of Kingston, Jamaica
Women mayors of places in Jamaica
2008 deaths
Year of birth missing
20th-century Jamaican women politicians
20th-century Jamaican politicians
21st-century Jamaican women politicians
21st-century Jamaican politicians